The 2018–19 Basketball Champions League playoffs will begin on 5 March, and will end on 5 May, with the Final, which will decide the champions of the 2018–19 Basketball Champions League. 16 teams compete in the play-offs.

Format
The playoffs involved the sixteen teams which qualified between the four first teams of each of the four groups in the 2018–19 Basketball Champions League Regular season.

The group winners will face the fourth qualified teams and the runners-up will play against the third qualified teams. Winners and runners-up will play the second leg at home. In addition, the winners of the matches involving the group winners will play also the second leg of the quarterfinals at home.

Each tie in the playoffs, apart from the Final Four games, was played with two legs, with each team playing one leg at home. The team that scored more points on aggregate, over the two legs, advanced to the next round.

For the round of 16, teams from the same group cannot be drawn against each other.

Qualified teams

Bracket

Round of 16
The first legs will be played on 5–6 March, and the second legs will be played on 12–13 March 2019.

|}

First leg

Second leg

Quarterfinals
The first legs will be played on 27 March, and the second legs will be played on 3 April 2019.

|}

First leg

Second leg

Final Four

References

External links
Basketball Champions League (official website)

2018–19 Basketball Champions League
Basketball Champions League playoffs